Below is a list of notable people born in Strumica, North Macedonia or its surroundings.

  Džordže Arsov, mayor of Kisela Voda municipality
  Zoran Baldovaliev, football striker
 Charalambos Boufidis, revolutionary
   Vasil Garvanliev, singer
  Vlado Ilievski, basketball player
 Evangelos Koukoudeas, revolutionary and army officer
  Igor Madžirov, Macedonian actor
  Zoran Madžirov, musician
  Goran Maznov, football striker
  Blagoj Mučeto, Macedonian and Yugoslav partisan
  Goran Pandev, football striker
  Saško Pandev, football striker
  Anton Panov, writer
  Vidoe Podgorec, writer and poet
  Goran Popov, football defender, Sc Heerenveen
  Robert Popov, football defender
 Dimitrios Semsis, virtuoso violinist
  Kiro Stojanov, Roman Catholic Bishop of the Skopje Diocese
  Boris Trajkovski, former Macedonian president
  Goran Trenchovski, film and theatre director; founder and CEO of AsterFest
  Dimitrios Tsitsimis, revolutionary, soldier, and mayor of Kilkis
 Baba Vanga, clairvoyant
  Zoran Zaev, politician

Strumica
List